Domenico Praticò is a neuropathologist, professor, and doctor who is an international expert on Alzheimer’s Disease, dementia, and neurodegenerative aging.

Biography
Praticò is the Scott Richards North Star Charitable Foundation Chair for Alzheimer’s Research and Director of the Alzheimer's Center at Temple University’s Lewis Katz School of Medicine in Philadelphia, Pennsylvania.

He received his MD from the University of Rome “La Sapienza” and previously taught at the University of Pennsylvania’s Perelman School of Medicine. He is also a fellow of the College of Physicians of Philadelphia.

Research
Praticò’s most recent research focuses on the effect extra-virgin olive oil (EVOO) has on the brain, particularly related to the buildup and prevention of toxic tau proteins, a key factor in Alzheimer’s disease. He demonstrated that a diet rich in EVOO can help prevent the mental decline associated with Alzheimer’s and other dementias.

Praticò’s other research focuses on bioactive oxidized lipids, where his work "has significantly contributed to the current understanding of their importance as biomarkers, mediators of cellular and molecular events involved in the pathogenesis of several clinical conditions, and therapeutic targets for preventing and treating human diseases."

He has received over $10 million in National Institutes of Health funding since 2001.

References

Alzheimer's disease researchers
Year of birth missing (living people)
Sapienza University of Rome alumni
Temple University faculty
Living people